The Peloponnese wall lizard (Podarcis peloponnesiacus) is a species of lizard in the family Lacertidae. It is endemic to the Peloponnese region of southern Greece. Its natural habitats are Mediterranean-type shrubby vegetation, rocky areas, arable land, pastureland, plantations, and rural gardens.

Description
Males are in general rather larger than females. It is a robust species with adult males having particularly large heads. The colouring is rather variable, basically being some shade of olive- or greyish-brown with a pale vertebral stripe and more clearly defined dorso-lateral pale stripes. The mottled flanks often have one or more blue spots above the shoulder and the blue colour may extend along the flanks in males. The underparts are red, orange or white and unspotted. Juveniles often have blue tails.

Behaviour
The Peloponnese wall lizard largely replaces the Greek rock lizard in the Peloponnese region. It is an agile species and climbs on rocks, walls and tree trunks. It often perches in an elevated position and can make long jumps between rocks. It often forages on the ground. The males are territorial during the breeding season and are very aggressive at this time.

Status
The Peloponnese wall lizard has a total area of occupancy of less than  but it is common in suitable habitat within its range. The population is steady and faces no significant threats (apart from wildfires) and the International Union for Conservation of Nature has assessed its conservation status as being of "least concern".

References

Podarcis
Endemic fauna of Greece
Lizards of Europe
Reptiles described in 1833
Taxa named by Gabriel Bibron
Taxa named by Jean Baptiste Bory de Saint-Vincent
Peloponnese
Taxonomy articles created by Polbot